Events in the year 1786 in India.

Incumbents
 Marquess Cornwallis, Governor-General, 1786-93 (also 1796-98 and 1805)

Events
National income - ₹10,251 million

References

 
India
Years of the 18th century in India